Kwalhioqua-Clatskanie (Kwalhioqua-Tlatskanai) is an extinct Athabascan language of northwest Oregon and southwest Washington state, along the lower Columbia River.

Dialects
Dialects were:

 Kwalhioqua (a.k.a. Willapa or Willoopah) (north of the lower Columbia River)
Willapa or Wela'pakote'li subdialect
Suwal subdialect
 Clatskanie (a.k.a. Tlatskanai) (south of the lower Columbia River)

References

Northern Athabaskan languages
Extinct languages of North America